Tony Pape (born September 29, 1981) is a former American football offensive tackle who since 2010 has been an assistant football coach and in charge of the offensive line at Reavis High School in Burbank, Illinois. Pape was drafted by the Miami Dolphins in the seventh round of the 2004 NFL Draft. He has also been a member of the Berlin Thunder, Amsterdam Admirals and San Diego Chargers.

In 2009, Pape served as a graduate assistant coach to the Central Michigan University football team.  Pape had been a part-time assistant coach at North Central College.  

Pape is now the offensive line coach at Reavis High School Football in Burbank, Illinois.

References

1981 births
Living people
American football offensive tackles
Michigan Wolverines football players
Miami Dolphins players
Berlin Thunder players
Amsterdam Admirals players
San Diego Chargers players
Players of American football from Chicago